Kazarma (from , "the guard barracks") is the Venetian-era fortress of the city of Sitia in Crete, Greece. This fortress was built in the 13th Century during Venetian rule on Crete. The Venetians abandoned the town in 1651 and destroyed parts of the fortress to prevent its use by the Turks.

External links 
Citta di Settia map by Marco Boschini
Extensive article from ExploreCrete.com

Buildings and structures in Lasithi
Venetian fortifications in Crete
13th-century fortifications in Greece